Penja pepper (poivre de Penja) is a type of pepper (Piper nigrum) grown in the volcanic soil of the Penja Valley in Cameroon. It is available as green, white, black and red pepper. Its taste is influenced by the local volcanic soil, which is rich  in minerals. Under the name "poivre de Penja", the pepper is protected as a geographical indication in the 17 African OAPI countries under the Bangui agreement, as well as a Protected Geographical Indication in the European Union and Northern Ireland.

History 
Pepper culture was introduced into Cameroon by Antoine Decré, who had a banana plantation in Penja. The first export, a bag of 40 kg of white pepper, took place in March 1958.

The pepper became popular with Michelin-star chefs and was being sold for as much as €321 per kilogram as of May, 2016.

Sources 
 La presse du Cameroun, n° 2371, Thursday 20 March 1958

References

Piper (plant)
Cameroonian products with protected designation of origin